Nowy Dworek  is a village in the administrative district of Gmina Świebodzin, within Świebodzin County, Lubusz Voivodeship, in western Poland.

References

Nowy Dworek